Martin O'Donoghue (19 May 1933 – 20 July 2018) was an Irish Fianna Fáil politician who served as Minister for Education from March 1982 to October 1982, Minister for Economic Planning and Development from 1977 to 1979 and Minister without portfolio in July 1977. He served as a Senator for the Labour Panel from 1983 to 1987. He also served as a Teachta Dála (TD) for the Dún Laoghaire constituency from 1977 to 1982.

He was one of a few TDs to be appointed a Minister on their first day in the Dáil. He was a Fellow of Trinity College Dublin and served on the board of the O'Reilly Foundation.

Life
O'Donoghue was born in Dublin in 1933. He was educated in Crumlin and worked as a waiter in Dublin, becoming a mature student at Trinity College Dublin and being awarded a PhD in economics by the University of Dublin.

Career
From 1962 to 1964 and from 1967 to 1969, he was economic consultant at the Departments of Education and Finance respectively. He was elected a Fellow of Trinity College Dublin in 1969 and promoted to Associate Professor of Economics there in 1970. Between 1970 and 1973, O'Donoghue was economic adviser to the Taoiseach Jack Lynch.

Politics
At the 1977 general election O'Donoghue was elected to Dáil Éireann as a Fianna Fáil TD for the Dún Laoghaire constituency. He was chief author of the election manifesto which saw Fianna Fáil achieve an unprecedented twenty-seat majority. O'Donoghue was appointed Minister for Economic Planning and Development on his first day in office as a TD. In 1979, Charles Haughey became Taoiseach and O'Donoghue's ministerial position was abolished. In 1982, O'Donoghue was returned to Cabinet as Minister for Education. He resigned from the government in October 1982, when he refused to support Haughey in a leadership challenge, and in November 1982 lost his Dáil seat at the general election.

O'Donoghue entered Seanad Éireann after losing his Dáil seat. He remained in the Seanad until 1987. Later he left Fianna Fáil, becoming a supporter of the Progressive Democrats.

Later career
O'Donoghue returned to academia until his retirement in 1995. In 1998, he became a director of the Central Bank of Ireland, serving with this and its successor body until the end of April 2008. He was also a member of the Scholarship Board of the O'Reilly Foundation.

He died on 20 July 2018.

References

External links
The O'Reilly Foundation - Scholarship Board, and short profiles

 

1933 births
2018 deaths
Alumni of Trinity College Dublin
Fianna Fáil TDs
Members of the 21st Dáil
Members of the 22nd Dáil
Members of the 23rd Dáil
Members of the 17th Seanad
Ministers for Education (Ireland)
O'Reilly Foundation
People from Dún Laoghaire
Politicians from County Dublin
Fianna Fáil senators